Strapless is a 1989 film written and directed by David Hare.

Plot summary
An expatriate American doctor in London allows herself to lighten up when her freewheeling younger sister and a mysterious man enter her life. Her inhibitions released, the beautiful doctor learns that freedom has its own price.

Cast
Blair Brown – Dr. Lillian Hempel
Bruno Ganz – Raymond Forbes
Bridget Fonda – Amy Hempel
Alan Howard – Mr. Cooper
Michael Gough – Douglas Brodie
Hugh Laurie – Colin
Dana Gillespie – Julie Kovago
Spencer Leigh – Hus
Alexandra Pigg - Helen

Release
After the film's May 1990 U.S. theatrical release, it was released on videocassette in the United States by RCA/Columbia and in Canada by Cineplex Odeon. In 2000, the film was released on DVD by Anchor Bay. The DVD has since been discontinued.

References

External links

1989 films
1989 drama films
British drama films
Films directed by David Hare
Films produced by Rick McCallum
1980s English-language films
1980s British films